Gyobin is a river town in Homalin Township, Hkamti District, in the Sagaing Region of northwestern Burma. It is located east of Kaukngo. An old frontier outpost was located at Gyobin during the British Burma period.

References

External links
Maplandia World Gazetteer

Populated places in Hkamti District
Homalin Township